The 62nd Assembly District of Wisconsin is one of 99 districts in the Wisconsin State Assembly.  Located in Southeastern Wisconsin, the district covers most of the north half of Racine County, including the villages of Caledonia, North Bay, Raymond, and Wind Point, and part of the north side of the city of Racine.  The district also contains the historic Wind Point Lighthouse, the Frank Lloyd Wright-designed Wingspread complex, and the John H. Batten Airport. The district is represented by Republican Robert Wittke, since January 2019.

The 62nd Assembly District is located within Wisconsin's 21st Senate District, along with the 61st and 63rd Assembly Districts.

List of past representatives

References 

Wisconsin State Assembly districts
Racine County, Wisconsin